Doagh railway station served the village of Doagh in County Antrim, Northern Ireland.

History

The station was opened by the Belfast and Ballymena Railway on 11 April 1848.

The station was not located very near to the village from which it took its name, and by the end of its life, was served by very few trains. The station closed to passengers on 29 June 1970.

References 

Disused railway stations in County Antrim
Railway stations opened in 1848
Railway stations closed in 1970
Railway stations in Northern Ireland opened in 1848